Feliks Pašić (19 February 1939 – 31 July 2010) was a Serbian theatre and literary critic, publicist, journalist and translator. He won two Sterija Award for Best Theatre Review (1983, 1992) and Sterija Award for Exceptional Contribution to the Advancement of Theater Arts and Culture (2006).

Work

Books

 Savremenici (1965)
 Oluja (1987)
 Kako smo čekali Godoa kad su cvetale tikve (1992)
 Karlo Bulić - avantura kao život (1992)
 Zoran (1995)
 Glumci govore I, II (2003)
 Mira Trailović, gospođa iz velikog sveta (2006)
 Joakimovi potomci (2006)

Monographs
 Grad teatar Budva - Prvih deset godina (1998)
 Deset festivala pozorišta za đecu (2002)
 Grad teatar Budva - Drugih deset godina (2007)
 Beogradsko dramsko pozorište - 60 godina (2007)
 Vuk, z. p. Tršić, Vukovi sabori 1933-2008 (2008)
 Zvezdara teatar 1984-2009 (2009)

References

External links 
 

Journalists from Split, Croatia
Serbian journalists
Serbian translators
1939 births
2010 deaths
20th-century translators